Susong County is a county in the southwest of Anhui Province, situated on the northwest (left) bank of the Yangtze, bordering the provinces of Hubei to the west and Jiangxi to the south. It is located in the southwest of the jurisdiction of the prefecture-level city of Anqing and is its southernmost county-level division. The government of Susong County is located in Fuyu Town.

Administrative divisions
Susong County has jurisdiction over eight towns and fourteen townships.

Towns
  Fuyu, Fuxing, Xuling, Xiacang, Erlang, Susong County, Liangxiang, Poliang, Huikou

Townships
 Chenhan Township, Aikou Township, Zuoba Township, Qianling Township, Jiugu Township, Chengling Township, Zhoutou Township, Wujie Township, Changpu, Beiyu Township, Liuping Township, Zhifeng Township, Heta Township, Gaoling Township

Climate

Tourism
Little Orphan, a rock in the middle of the Yangtze in the county

References

External links

County-level divisions of Anhui
Anqing